Jonas Brorsson (born 12 July 1963) is a retired Swedish football defender.

He is the father of Franz Brorsson.

References

1963 births
Living people
Swedish footballers
Trelleborgs FF players
Gunnilse IS players
Association football defenders
Allsvenskan players